The 45th Directors Guild of America Awards, honoring the outstanding directorial achievements in films, documentary and television in 1992, were presented on March 6, 1993 at the Beverly Hilton and in New York. The ceremony in Beverly Hills was hosted by Carl Reiner and the ceremony in New York was hosted by Jerry Orbach. The feature film nominees were announced on January 25, 1993 and the other nominations were announced starting on February 22, 1993. Prior to the nominations announcement, finalists were announced for the television categories.

Winners and nominees

Film

Television

Commercials

D.W. Griffith Award
 Sidney Lumet

Lifetime Achievement in Sports Direction
 Harry Coyle

Frank Capra Achievement Award
 Willard H. Sheldon

Robert B. Aldrich Service Award
 Gene Reynolds
 John Rich

Franklin J. Schaffner Achievement Award
 James Woodworth

Honorary Life Member
 Arthur Hiller

References

External links
 

Directors Guild of America Awards
1992 film awards
1992 television awards
Direct
Direct
Directors
1993 in Los Angeles
1993 in New York City
March 1993 events in the United States